Matthew Ross is an American film director, screenwriter, journalist and fiction writer based in Brooklyn. He is best known for writing and directing Frank & Lola, which debuted at the 2016 Sundance Film Festival and was later released by Universal Studios.

Early life
Born and raised in New York City, Ross attended Harvard University, where he graduated Magna Cum Laude with Honors with a degree in Visual and Environmental Studies, concentrating in filmmaking. While at Harvard, he was a member of the Harvard Boxing Club.

Journalism career
Ross began his career as a film journalist. His first staff position of note was as a film reporter for Variety in 2000. At the age of 25, he was hired as the senior editor of Indiewire, overseeing the site's editorial coverage as well as writing a regular industry column, followed by a four-year stint as the managing editor of Filmmaker magazine. While at Filmmaker, Ross wrote many of the magazine's cover stories and major features, including profiles of directors Robert Altman, Steven Soderbergh, George Clooney, Todd Solondz, Alexander Payne, Richard Linklater, Robert Towne, Michel Gondry, among others. Ross eventually expanded his focus beyond film, writing pieces that ranged from feature profiles of MMA champions for FIGHT! magazine to long-form investigative journalism for Playboy. As a freelancer, his work has appeared in The Village Voice, Nerve, The Criterion Collection, and dozens of other publications.

Film & Television Career
Ross began making films in college, including the festival shorts Here Comes Your Man, A Hero's Welcome, Curtis and Clover, Lola, and Red Angel. Another short he made was Inspired By Bret Easton Ellis, commissioned by Ellis and described by critic Roger Ebert as "one terrific video!". He also directed, wrote and produced a nonfiction viral series about professional fighters, FIGHT! Life!, which logged over eight-million YouTube views as of 2019.

After his first screenplay Plays Well with Others (co-written with Guy Cimbalo) was optioned by the production company Anonymous Content, Ross moved to Los Angeles, where he wrote and rewrote scripts for a number of producers and production companies. He also worked as a story consultant on Curb Your Enthusiasm, including contributing plotlines to "Palestinian Chicken," winner of the 2011 DGA Award for "Best Comedy Episode". Vanity Fair called Palestinian Chicken the "crowning achievement in the entire series."

Frank & Lola
While in Los Angeles, Ross began raising money, cast, and production support on another project, Frank & Lola, which would eventually become his directorial debut. In 2014, backed by Parts and Labor Films' producers Jay Van Hoy and Lars Knudsen, Killer Films' Christine Vachon and David Hinojosa, producer John Baker, Preferred Content's Kevin Iwashina and Las Vegas-based production company Lola Pictures, the film began production, with Michael Shannon (Frank) and Imogen Poots (Lola) in the lead roles. The other major parts were played by Michael Nyqvist (Alan), Justin Long (Keith), Rosanna Arquette (Patricia), and Emmanuelle Devos (Claire). Financed by Great Point Media, Frank & Lola wrapped in March, 2015.

On December 7, 2015, it was announced that Frank & Lola had been accepted to the 2016 Sundance Film Festival for its world premiere. During the festival, after the film opened to overwhelmingly positive reviews, Universal Studios secured its worldwide rights (with the exception of a few minor territories) for over $2 million, with a theatrical release planned for later that year.

Ross and Frank & Lola were listed on a number of "best of" Sundance 2016 wrap-up stories, including articles in Indiewire (#3 on the list of "Top 25 Filmmakers and Actors That Broke Through at Sundance 2016"), The Film Stage ("The 15 Best Films at Sundance 2016"), and Ioncinema ("Best of Fest: Sundance 2016's Top 10 New Voices").

The film was released theatrically and on VOD in the U.S. on December 9, 2016.

Wu-Tang: An American Saga
In 2021, RZA and Alex Tse tapped Ross to direct Hulu's Wu-Tang: An American Saga, the origin story of hip-hop legends the Wu-Tang Clan, set in 1990s New York City. Ross returned the following year to direct two pivotal episodes in the show's final season.

Other Work 
Ross wrote for the hit ABC series Nashville (writing two episodes and serving as creative consultant for Season 5), in addition to selling several pilots to major networks. He also directed the feature Siberia in 2018.

Fiction Writing
In September 2022, Neotext published JUNKMAN, Ross’s first book, a sci-fi novella collaboration with legendary comics artist Joe Staton. A sequel is in the works.

Filmography

References

External links
 
 
 Official Website

Living people
1976 births
Harvard University alumni